is a Japanese actor and model.

Life and career
Aoki was born in Saitama Prefecture, Japan on October 19, 1987. After the death of his father in 2007, Aoki took up numerous part-time jobs to support his mother and sister. While working as a champagne server at a car show, he was recruited by the president of Dolce Star management.

Aoki initially started out as a model but developed an interest in becoming an actor. He made his acting debut as Keigo Atobe in the 2nd season of the stage adaptation of the popular anime series The Prince Of Tennis.

Aoki quit Dolce Star management on March 31, 2018.

Aoki was arrested on forced indecent assault on April 5, 2018. On April 27, charges were dropped.

Filmography

Television

Films

Stage

References

External links
Official website 
Official profile at Dolce Star 

Japanese male actors
1987 births
Living people
Actors from Saitama Prefecture